Battles near or Sieges of Danzig (Gdańsk) took place several times in the history of Danzig. The most notable are:

 Teutonic takeover of Danzig (Gdańsk) in 1308. This event involved several parties
 Siege of Danzig (1577) by king Stefan Batory, following the Danzig rebellion. Inconclusive, lifted as a compromise was negotiated
  Siege of Danzig (1626–1629) – one or more unsuccessful Swedish sieges during that period
 Battle of Oliva 1627: naval battle in the vicinity of Oliwa (currently part of Gdańsk)
 Siege of Danzig (1655–1660): Unsuccessful siege by Swedish forces in the Deluge
 Siege of Danzig (1734): Russians capture the city during the War of the Polish Succession
 Siege of Danzig (1807): French capture the city from Prussians during the War of the Fourth Coalition
 Siege of Danzig (1813): Russian forces against French Army. 
 Events starting on 1 September 1939
 Defense of the Polish Post Office in Danzig
 Battle of Westerplatte – German battleship vs. the Polish fortified ammunition depot
 Battle of the Danzig Bay – German aircraft against Polish vessels
 in 1945, the Soviet Army takes over the city during the East Pomeranian Offensive. For details, see Siege of Danzig (1945).

History of Gdańsk
Danzig